Valderrubio is a municipality in the province of Granada, Spain. As of 2012, it had a population of 2,133 inhabitants.

The poet Federico García Lorca lived in the village as a young child, between 1905 and 1909. At that time it was known as Asquerosa (which means 'filthy' in Spanish). It was renamed Valderrubio in 1943.

References

External links 

Municipalities in the Province of Granada